The Rucensi were an ancient people of Sardinia, noted by Ptolemy (III, 3).  They dwelt south of the Æchilenenses (also called Cornenses) and north of the Celsitani and the Corpicenses.

References
Ptolemy's Geography online

Ancient peoples of Sardinia